Men's football tournament at 2010 South Asian Games from 29 January to 8 February in Bangladesh.

Fixtures and results

Group A

Group B

Semi finals

Third place play-off

Final

Winner

Notes and references

External links
 RSSSF

2010 South Asian Games
2010 South Asian Games - Men's tournament